MapmyIndia is an Indian technology company that builds digital map data, telematics services, location-based SaaS and GIS AI technologies. The company was founded in 1995 and is headquartered at New Delhi with regional offices in Mumbai and Bengaluru and smaller offices across India. It also has international offices in the San Francisco Bay Area and Tokyo.

History
MapmyIndia was founded by Rakesh and Rashmi Verma in 1995. The couple launched a startup called CE Info Systems in 1995 at New Delhi, India. The company started working upon developing a web mapping technology and provide products and services required for enhancing marketing and logistics efficiency in existing organizations in the country. Soon after, the company took up an assignment to develop good quality maps with detailed topography to support the marketing and logistics operations of Coca-Cola and Cellular One.

The company launched the first Indian interactive digital mapping portal "www.mapmyindia.com" in 2004. This portal provided free, customized, location-based services including assigning an e-location to existing addresses to enable last mile deliveries to their exact destinations. The services were available for mobile phones with internet connectivity also. These services were also provided through the MapmyIndia portal to MagicBricks.   
  
In 2010, MapmyIndia launched a GPS navigation service called Road Pilot, preloaded with Indian cities, villages and destinations. The company's online maps are integrated with ISRO Satellite Imagery for detailed satellite and hybrid. As of 2018, it has 5000+ enterprise customers and over 250 million consumers benefit directly and indirectly from its services. MapmyIndia has also expanded into the Indian subcontinent by creating maps of Sri Lanka, Bangladesh, Bhutan and Nepal and soon plans to release maps for the different parts of the world.

In 2020, MapmyIndia launched a unique COVID-19 dashboard that in real time mapped containment zones and Covid testing and treatment centers across India and made it available for free access to millions of web and mobile users. It greatly benefited users needing this information as the incumbent global mapping giant, Google was slow to respond and released it many months later. It also won the Government of India's AatmaNirbhar Bharat App Innovation Challenge for its consumer app, Move.

Product and services
MapmyIndia offers Navigation, Tracking, IoT, Analytics and web mapping service for desktop and mobile devices. The company also offers advanced GPS tracking devices, car in-dash infotainment & plug & play on-board diagnostics car tracker. The navigation service features street view, public transit information and turn-by-turn navigation with spoken instructions for vehicles.

Market share
The company's navigation and location services are primarily used by vehicle manufacturers (cars, bikes, commercial vehicles, electric vehicles) and it has 95% market share on GPS navigation in India. It also claims to have 5,000 enterprise customers with 80% market share in the location intelligence space. MapmyIndia's cloud mapping services are also used by many developers and tech companies in India such as PhonePe, Paytm, Amazon, Alexa voice, Flipkart, Uber, Ola Cabs, Blinkit, etc. for planning, operations and customer experience.

Funding
MapmyIndia has raised $34 million in venture capital financing in the three rounds since 2007 from the Lightbox Ventures, Nexus Venture Partners, Qualcomm Ventures and Zenrin. In 2015, Flipkart announced that it has acquired 34% stake of the company for Rs 1,600 crores and provided a successful exit to MapmyIndia's early investors. Over the years, the firm's value has more than tripled due to increase in adoption of its technologies.

References

External links 

Web mapping
Internet properties established in 1995
Street view services
Indian websites
Indian companies established in 1995
Companies based in New Delhi
2021 initial public offerings
Companies listed on the Bombay Stock Exchange
Companies listed on the National Stock Exchange of India